Arde is the third album by Spanish band Migala. It was released on Sub Pop and Acuarela Discos on June 10, 2001.

Critical reception 

The album was met with positive reviews from critics. At Metacritic, which assigns a weighted average rating out of 100 to reviews from mainstream publications, this release received an average score of 77, based on six reviews, which indicates "generally favorable reviews".

Track listing

Personnel 

David Belmonte – keyboard arrangements, electric guitar arrangements
Abel Hernández – vocals, acoustic guitar, electric guitar, keyboard, effects
Rodrigo Hernández – bass, acoustic guitar, electric guitar, keyboard, percussion, melodica, choir, noise
Migala – production
Rubén Moreno – drums, percussion, violin
Silvia Raposo – cello
 – vocals (3)
Jordi Sancho – Rhodes piano, keyboard, bass
Alberto Seara – recordings
Carlos Torero – bongos (1), recording
 – guitar, effects
Coque Yturriaga – keyboard, noise, electric guitar, backing vocals
Diego Yturriaga – accordion, dulzaina, Casiotone, irons, choir

References 

2001 albums
Albums by Spanish artists
Sub Pop albums